Sharansky District (Şaran rayonı) is an administrative and municipal district (raion), one of the fifty-four in the Republic of Bashkortostan, Russia. It is located in the west of the republic and borders with Bakalinsky District in the northwest and north, Chekmagushevsky District in the northeast, Buzdyaksky District in the southeast, Tuymazinsky District in the south, and with the Republic of Tatarstan in the west. Its administrative center is the rural locality (a selo) of Sharan. As of the 2010 Census, the total population of the district was 22,514, with the population of Sharan accounting for 26.3% of that number.

History
The district was established on January 31, 1935, when it was split from Tuymazinsky District.

Administrative and municipal status
Within the framework of administrative divisions, Sharansky District is one of the fifty-four in the Republic of Bashkortostan. The district is divided into 13 selsoviets, comprising 103 rural localities. As a municipal division, the district is incorporated as Sharansky Municipal District. Its thirteen selsoviets are incorporated as thirteen rural settlements within the municipal district. The selo of Sharan serves as the administrative center of both the administrative and municipal district.

References

Notes

Sources

Districts of Bashkortostan
States and territories established in 1935
 
